Vrsadeva, or Vrasadeva, was a Licchavi king of Nepal who ruled from 400–425.

References

History of Nepal
4th-century Nepalese people
Nepalese monarchs